The 56th Cavalry Brigade was a brigade of the Texas Army National Guard. Its legacy is carried by the modern-day 56th Infantry Brigade Combat Team.

As part of a post First World War reorganization plan in 1919 the 51st through 59th Brigades were created and designated by the US Army as separate National Guard cavalry brigades, although they were notional units that existed mostly on paper. In 1936, four National Guard cavalry divisions were fashioned from pairing up the cavalry brigades. They formed the 21st (51st and 59th Cavalry Brigades), the 22nd (52d and 54th Cavalry Brigades), 23d (53d and 55th Cavalry Brigades), and the 24th (57th and 58th Cavalry Brigades) Cavalry Divisions. The remaining 56th Cavalry Brigade was designated a non-divisional cavalry brigade.

In 1940, the US government began considering the value of mounted troops on the modern 20th-century battlefield. Although the fledgeling Armored Force was sorely in need of troops and funding, the Regular Army deemed the National Guard incapable of maintaining and repairing complex armored vehicles and the state governments and attendant National Guard units refused to give up horse cavalry units. In November 1940, the National Guard cavalry units were disbanded and its elements reorganized as mechanized and armored units. This left the 56th Cavalry Brigade as the sole remaining horse cavalry unit. Its elements were the 112th and 124th Cavalry Regiments.

Army Ground Forces eliminated the 56th Cavalry Brigade when no use for it developed overseas. In mid-1944, the Headquarters and Headquarters Troop, 56th Cavalry Brigade became the 56th Reconnaissance Troop, Mechanized. Its headquarters troop became the 56th Cavalry Reconnaissance Troop, Mechanized, but did not see combat. The former brigade's cavalry regiments went on to fight in the Pacific and China-Burma-India theaters.

Commanding Generals
(1942-1943): Colonel Harry H. Johnson.

Notes
http://www.globalsecurity.org/military/agency/army/56cav-bde.htm
http://www.texasmilitaryforcesmuseum.org/1940/56brigade.htm

References

Military units and formations of the United States Army in World War II
056
Military units and formations established in 1919